Amr ibn Hurayth ibn Amr ibn Uthman al-Makhzumi (died 705) was a prominent member of the Quraysh in Kufa and the deputy governor of the city under the Umayyad governors of Iraq Ziyad ibn Abihi (670–673), Ubayd Allah ibn Ziyad (675–683) and Bishr ibn Marwan (692–694).

Life
Amr was the son of Hurayth ibn Amr ibn Uthman ibn Abd Allah ibn Umar ibn Makhzum and belonged to the Banu Makhzum clan of the Quraysh tribe of Mecca. He became the wealthiest person in the Arab garrison town and administrative center of Kufa in Iraq. When Kufa was added to Ziyad ibn Abihi's governorship by Caliph Mu'awiya I in 670, thereby making Ziyad governor of all Iraq, Ziyad made Amr his deputy governor over Kufa. He remained in this post until Ziyad's death in 673 and was reinstalled by Ziyad's son and ultimate successor, Ubayd Allah who took office in 675. Ibn Ziyad also made him head of his shurta (security forces). Ibn Ziyad was expelled from Basra after the death of Caliph Yazid I and Amr was similarly toppled by the Kufans, who replaced him with Amir ibn Mas'ud al-Jumahi. The Umayyad governor of Iraq, Bishr ibn Marwan appointed Amr his deputy in Kufa in 692–94. He is credited by Ahmad ibn Hanbal for introducing the ceremony marking the Day of Arafat in Kufa, though this has also been ascribed to Mus'ab ibn al-Zubayr. He died in 705.

References

Bibliography

705 deaths
7th-century Arabs
7th-century people from the Umayyad Caliphate
Banu Makhzum
Umayyad governors of Kufa